The 183rd Street station was a local station on the demolished IRT Third Avenue Line in the Bronx, New York City.  It was opened on July 1, 1901, and was one of three stations built when the line was extended to Fordham Plaza. It had three tracks and two side platforms. The station was located near what is today Saint Barnabas Hospital Pediatrics, and was five blocks east of the former New York Central Railroad station of the same name along the Harlem Line. The next stop to the north was Fordham Road–190th Street. The next stop to the south was 180th Street. The station closed on April 29, 1973. This station was very famous for Dondi's "Children of the Grave: Part II"

References

External links 

IRT Third Avenue Line stations
Railway stations in the United States opened in 1901
Railway stations closed in 1973
1901 establishments in New York City
1973 disestablishments in New York (state)
Former elevated and subway stations in the Bronx
Belmont, Bronx
Third Avenue